Air Ranger: Rescue Helicopter  is a helicopter simulator video game released for the Sony PlayStation 2, developed by ASK Corporation and published by Midas Interactive Entertainment. The game was released on March 29, 2001 in Japan, and November 15, 2002 for Europe. The game was never released in North America. In the game the player must take the role of a Rescue Helicopter pilot, and complete missions involving accidents such as car crashes or fires.

Reception
On release, Famitsu magazine scored the game a 30 out of 40.

Air Ranger 2 Plus Rescue Helicopter 
A sequel to Air Ranger has been released for PlayStation 2.  Air Ranger 2 allows the player to pilot rescue and law enforcement helicopters.  All the helicopters from the previous game are available with a few extra helicopters such as the Eurocopter AS365 Dauphin and Sikorsky H-53.

See also
City Crisis
SimCopter

References

2001 video games
Flight simulation video games
Helicopter video games
PlayStation 2 games
PlayStation 2-only games
Video games about firefighting
Video games developed in Japan